Buttercorn Lady is a live album by drummer Art Blakey's New Jazz Messengers recorded at The Lighthouse jazz club in 1966 and originally released that year on the Limelight label. The album was the first commercial recording to feature pianist Keith Jarrett, who had joined Blakey's band a few months earlier.

Reception

Scott Yanow of Allmusic stated that "this particular version of The Jazz Messengers only had the opportunity to record this one excellent live LP (which is currently out of print) but proved to be a worthy successor to their more acclaimed predecessors".

Track listing 
All compositions are by Chuck Mangione except where noted.
 "Buttercorn Lady" - 3:10   
 "Recuerdo" - 14:20   
 "The Theme" (Kenny Dorham) - 2:20   
 "Between Races" - 4:32   
 "My Romance" (Richard Rodgers, Lorenz Hart) - 6:07   
 "Secret Love" (Paul Francis Webster, Sammy Fain) - 9:00

Personnel 
Art Blakey - drums
Chuck Mangione - trumpet
Frank Mitchell - tenor saxophone
Keith Jarrett - piano
Reggie Johnson - bass

References 

Art Blakey live albums
The Jazz Messengers live albums
1966 live albums
Limelight Records live albums